Philicon Valley is a neologism for Philadelphia's version of Silicon Valley.  Forbes coined the term on November 17, 1999 to refer specifically to the suburbs of Valley Forge and Wayne, Pennsylvania, which was also referred to as "Silicon Valley Forge" and "E-Valley Forge."  In the Delaware Valley, many "... new-economy companies have located themselves in the suburbs along Route 202..." due to the high tax base in the city of Philadelphia.  From a marketing perspective, the term has been used by Internet companies to lure potential employees in the tech sector, that markets the firm as part of a large community of like companies in a suburb of Philadelphia.  "Pennsylvania Dutch Country is only about a 90 minute drive away..." noting that the area is home to "... large high-tech companies..."  The lure in the region has many Penn graduates, as well as other graduates do not consider Philadelphia to be the "hot spot" and some have chosen this region as an alternative.  A briefing on the region, says the area contributes to Pennsylvania being ranked eighth in hi tech employing more than 170,000 according to the Ben Franklin Technology Partners of Southeastern Pennsylvania, WHYY-TV, and the Council for Urban Economic Development.

Notable firms

According to the same Forbes article, the firms that had a presence in this region specialized in business-to-business partnerships.
 Safeguard Scientifics
 Novell
 Cambridge Technology Partners
 VerticalNet
 Internet Capital Group
 Comcast

Other notable companies that "put the region on the map" specialized in "entrepreneurialism" included:
 General Instrument
 Motorola
 WorldGate
 CDNow
 RCN

Philicon Valley Today
 Bentley Systems
 Checkpoint Systems
 Clarivate
 DuckDuckGo
 EPAM Systems
 Fiserv
 GSI Commerce
 Gopuff
 Radial, Inc.
 Radian Group
 Ricoh (formerly Ikon Office Solutions)
 SAP
 Unisys
 Vishay Intertechnology

See also
 Avenue of Technology (Philadelphia)

References

Geography of Philadelphia
Economy of Philadelphia
1999 introductions
High-technology business districts in the United States
1999 neologisms